Vocalists are capable of producing a variety of extended technique sounds. These alternative singing techniques have been used extensively in the 20th century, especially in art song and opera. Particularly famous examples of extended vocal technique can be found in the music of Luciano Berio, John Cage, George Crumb, Peter Maxwell Davies, Hans Werner Henze, György Ligeti, Demetrio Stratos, Meredith Monk, Giacinto Scelsi, Arnold Schoenberg, Salvatore Sciarrino, Karlheinz Stockhausen, Tim Foust, Avi Kaplan, and Trevor Wishart.

Timbral techniques

Phrasing

Spoken
Spoken text is frequently employed. The Italian term "parlando" has a similar meaning.

Rapping

Sprechgesang

Sprechgesang is a combination singing and speaking. It is usually heavily associated with Arnold Schoenberg (particularly his Pierrot Lunaire which uses sprechgesang for its entire duration) and the Second Viennese School. Schoenberg notated sprechgesang by placing a small cross through the stem of a note which indicates approximate pitch. In more modern music “sprechgesang” is frequently simply written over a passage of music.

Inhaling
Singing is produced while a singer is inhaling. This technique combined with exhaling and other techniques can produce a continuous stream of voice that is widely used in extreme metal styles like death metal, it is also employed in other styles to create a strained or even humorous effect.

Pitch

Falsetto

A vocal technique allowing the singer to sing notes higher than their modal vocal range.

Glottal sounds

A "frying"-type sound may be produced by means of the glottis. This technique has been frequently used by Meredith Monk.

Yodelling
 
Yodelling is performed by rapidly alternating between a singer's chest and head voice.

Ululation

A long, wavering, high-pitched vocal sound resembling a howl with a trilling quality. It is produced by emitting a high-pitched loud voice accompanied with a rapid back-and-forth movement of the tongue and the uvula. Ululation is practiced in certain styles of singing, as well as in communal ritual events, used to express strong emotion.

Reverberation

Vocal tremolo
A vocal tremolo is performed by rapidly pulsing the air expelled from the singer's lungs while singing a pitch. These pulses usually occur from 4–8 times per second.

Vocal trill
A vocal trill is performed by adding singing vibrato while performing a vocal tremolo.

Rekuhkara

Harmonics

Overtones

By manipulating the vocal cavity, overtones may be produced. Although used in the traditional music of Mongolia, Tuva, and Tibet, overtones have also been used in the contemporary compositions of Karlheinz Stockhausen (Stimmung), as well as in the work of David Hykes.

Undertones
By carefully controlling the configurations of the vocal cords, a singer may obtain "undertones" which may produce period doubling, tripling or a higher degree of multiplication; this may give rise to tones that fairly coincide with those of an inverse harmonic series. Although the octave below is the most frequently used undertone, a twelfth below and other lower undertones are also possible. This technique has been used most notably by Joan La Barbara..However, undertones may be generated by processes that include more than the vocal folds. For instance, the ventricular folds (also called the "false vocal folds") may be recruited, probably by solely aerodynamic forces, and made to vibrate with the vocal folds, generating undertones, like those found, for instance, in Tibetan low-pitched chant.

Multiphonics
By overstressing or by asymmetrically contracting the laryngeal muscles, a multiphonic or chord may be produced. This technique features in the 1968 composition Versuch über Schweine by the German composer Hans Werner Henze. In voice pathology, there are various descriptions of somewhat similar effects, such as those found in patients with diplophonia, a condition that produces a "double voice", i.e., two or even more simultaneous pitches.

Distortion

Screaming

Growling

Buccal speech

A form of alaryngeal speech that has a high pitch that can be used for speaking and singing. It is most familiar as the voice of Donald Duck.

Non-vocal sounds
Besides producing sounds with the mouth, singers can be required to clap or snap their fingers, shuffle their feet, or slap their body. This is usually notated by writing the appropriate word over a note. These gestures are sometimes written on a separate one-line staff as well.

Artificial timbral changes

Inhalation of gases
Inhaled helium is occasionally used to drastically change the timbre of the voice. When inhaled, helium changes the resonant properties of the human vocal track resulting in a very high squeaky voice. In Salvatore Martirano's composition L’s GA the singer is required to inhale from a helium mask.

Conversely, an unnaturally low voice may be achieved by asking the singer to inhale sulfur hexafluoride. This technique is less popular than helium inhalation, in part because of the inherent risk of the gas displacing oxygen in the lungs.

Artificial vocal enhancement
Amplification, such as microphone or even megaphone, possibly with electronic distortion of the voice, is frequently used in contemporary composition. Through the use of various electronic distortion techniques, vocal enhancement possibilities are nearly unlimited. A good example of this technique can be found in much of the music written and performed by Laurie Anderson.

Singing into the piano
There are a number of pieces which require a singer to lean over a (sometimes amplified) piano and sing directly into the strings. If the strings are not damped, the effect is to start audible sympathetic vibrations in the piano. By far the most famous piece to use this technique is Ancient Voices of Children by George Crumb.

Notable performers using extended vocal techniques
 George "Corpsegrinder" Fisher
 Laurie Anderson
 Gelsey Bell
 Cathy Berberian
 Yma Súmac
 Iva Bittová
 Thomas Buckner
 Jill Burton
 Jan DeGaetani
 Paul Dutton
 Diamanda Galás
 Roy Hart
 Imogen Heap
 Shelley Hirsch
 David Hykes
 Nicholas Isherwood
 Sofia Jernberg
 Joan La Barbara
 Phil Minton
 Fatima Miranda
 Meredith Monk
 David Moss
 Sainkho Namtchylak
 Yoko Ono
 Mike Patton
 Carol Plantamura
 Vahram Sargsyan
 Alice Shields
 Demetrio Stratos
 Michael Vetter
 Jennifer Walshe
 Trevor Wishart
 Alfred Wolfsohn
 Savina Yannatou
 Pamela Z
 Jim Morrison

See also 
 Throat singing (disambiguation)

References

 Blatter, Alfred (1980). Instrumentation/Orchestration. New York: Schirmer Books.
 Read, Gardner (1969). Music Notation. 2nd ed. Boston: Crescendo Publishing Co.
 Edgerton, Michael Edward (2005). The 21st-Century Voice: Contemporary and Traditional Extra-Normal Voice. Lanham: Scarecrow Press.- 
 Fuks, Leonardo ; Hammarberg, Britta; Sundberg, John (1998): "A self-sustained vocal-ventricular phonation mode: acoustical, aerodynamic and glottographic evidences", KTH TMH-QPSR 3/1998, 49–59, Stockholm

External links

Listening
 Vox Humana: Alfred Wolfsohn's Experiments in Extension of Human Vocal Range (Folkways Records, 1956)
 Lexicon of Extended Vocal Techniques

Extended techniques
Extended vocal